Orbital stability may refer to:

The stability of orbits of planetary bodies
Resonance between said orbits
The closure of the orbit of a reductive group, in geometric invariant theory
A stable electron configuration